Anne Donnelly (born 1932) is an Irish artist living in Italy.

Life
Born in Belfast, Donnelly grew up in County Carlow. She studied in the National College of Art in Dublin graduating in 1953 and then went on to the Escuela de Bellas Artes in Madrid before finishing at the Ecole Julienne in Paris in 1956. While in Paris, Donnelly met her husband Carlo Mazzantini who died in 2006. They had four daughters, including the novelist Margaret Mazzantini and the actress Giselda Volodi.

The whole family spent time travelling in France, Spain, Ireland and Morocco through the late 50s and early 60s. They settled initially in Tuscany and finally in Tivoli.

Career

Donnelly has exhibited since the 50s in public and private collections throughout Ireland, Italy, Great Britain, France, Spain, Greece, Argentina, Switzerland, USA and Australia. She has received praise from critics such as Elena Pontiggia, Seamus Heaney, Guido Giuffrè, and Paul Cahill.
Exhibitions include : 2007 Riflessi Diversi: Artist and Irish poets, in Torre di Magione, 2008 Equus, semper. Art Hippodrome in Rome, The Museum of Modern Art (M.O.M.A), New York and regularly in the Peppercanister Gallery in Dublin and the Claremorris Gallery, Co. Mayo.

She is a member of DUNA (part of the International Association of Women Artists)

References

External links
Independent review

1932 births
Living people
20th-century Irish painters
20th-century Irish women artists
21st-century Irish painters
21st-century Irish women artists
Artists from Belfast
Alumni of the National College of Art and Design
Irish women painters